Lassie Come-Home is a novel written by Eric Knight about a rough collie's trek over many miles to be reunited with the boy she loves. Author Eric Knight introduced the reading public to the canine character of Lassie in a magazine story published on December 17, 1938, in The Saturday Evening Post, a story which he later expanded to a novel and published in 1940 to critical and commercial success. In 1943, the novel was adapted to the Metro-Goldwyn-Mayer feature film Lassie Come Home starring Roddy McDowall as the boy Joe Carraclough, Pal as Lassie, and featuring Elizabeth Taylor. The motion picture was selected for inclusion in the National Film Registry. A remake of Lassie Come Home, entitled Lassie, was released in 2005.

The hyphen in the title is both an adjective referring to Lassie's purpose as a dog that must turn home and it is the name given to the dog in the final chapter where the boy says to the dog: "Ye brought us luck. 'Cause ye're a come-homer. Ye're my Lassie Come-Home. Lassie Come-Home. That's thy name! Lassie Come-Home". In another part of the book, a cynical character falsely accuses the Carraclough family of training such dogs for fraud: "I know all about yer and yer come-home dogs. Training 'em to break loose and run right back 'ome when they're sold, so then ye can sell 'em to someone else." Film adaptations of the novel do not include the hyphen.

Reception
Lassie Come-Home won the 1943 Young Reader's Choice Award.

References

External links
 

1940 American novels
1940 British novels
Fictional dogs
Lassie
British novels adapted into films
American novels adapted into films
Novels about dogs
British children's novels
American children's novels
1940 children's books